Ha'Sean Treshon "Ha Ha" Clinton-Dix (born December 21, 1992) is a former American football safety who played in the National Football League (NFL) for seven seasons, primarily with the Green Bay Packers. He played college football at Alabama and was drafted by the Packers in the first round of the 2014 NFL Draft. He later played for the Washington Redskins and the Chicago Bears, before briefly appearing with the Las Vegas Raiders. He is currently the Director of Player Development for the Alabama Crimson Tide.

Early years
A native of Eatonville, Florida, Clinton-Dix was nicknamed "HaHa" as an infant by his grandmother in response to "Ha'Sean" often being pronounced  (like "Shaun") instead of the intended  (like "seen"). He prefers to go by "HaHa" and has stated that both he and his coaches love the moniker.  In an interview, he explained that the true nickname is actually "HaHa" (in Pascal case, no space, two capitals).

Clinton-Dix spent his freshman and sophomore years at Edgewater High School, where he played running back and was a teammate of Mike Brewster. Before his junior year, Clinton-Dix transferred to Dr. Phillips High School, where he played alongside Dee Hart. In addition to football, he lettered in basketball and track, participating in the 4 × 100 m and 4 × 400 m relay at Edgewater. In football, he was an All-American defensive back and kick returner at Dr. Phillips. Named a five-star recruit by Rivals.com, Clinton-Dix was ranked the No. 1 safety in his class and sixth-rated player overall. During his senior football season, Clinton-Dix, teamed with All-American running back Hart, led Dr. Phillips to a 14–1 season. The Panthers lost to future NFL running back Devonta Freeman and Miami Central in the Florida 6A State Championship Game, ending the season ranked #21 nationally by Rivals.com.

College career
Clinton-Dix was one of seven true freshmen that had playing time in 2011 for the Alabama Crimson Tide football team. Alabama won the 2011 national championship as it shut out LSU 21–0. In 2012, he led the team with five interceptions, and made seven tackles against Notre Dame in the 2012 championship game, one tackle less than C. J. Mosley. Alabama again won the BCS National Championship by blowing out Notre Dame by a score of 42–14.

On October 3, 2013, Clinton-Dix was suspended indefinitely for unspecified team rules violations, being reinstated after two games. He was a consensus selection for the 2013 All-America Team.

On December 2, 2013, he underwent arthroscopic surgery to repair a torn meniscus in his knee. He finished his junior year with 51 tackles and 2 interceptions. As a junior in 2013, Clinton-Dix was a first-team All-Southeastern Conference (SEC) selection. He was named among the top 5 safeties by NFL Media analyst Charles Davis.

After the season, he decided to forgo his senior year and enter the 2014 NFL Draft. Clinton-Dix returned to school in 2017 to complete his degree, interning at the Green Bay Police Department. He graduated in 2018 with a bachelor's degree in criminal justice.

Statistics

Professional career
On January 9, 2014, it was announced that Clinton-Dix had officially decided to forgo his remaining eligibility and enter the 2014 NFL Draft. Clinton-Dix attended the NFL Scouting Combine in Indianapolis and completed all of the combine and positional drills. On March 12, 2014, he participated at Alabama's pro day, but opted to stand on his combine numbers and only performed positional drills. He also attended pre-draft visits with multiple teams, including the Baltimore Ravens, Detroit Lions, Philadelphia Eagles, and Tennessee Titans.

At the conclusion of the pre-draft process, Clinton-Dix was projected to be a first or second round pick by NFL draft experts and scouts. He was ranked as the top safety prospect in the draft by NFL analyst Mike Mayock, was ranked as the top free safety by DraftScout.com, and was ranked the second best safety by Sports Illustrated.

Green Bay Packers

2014
The Green Bay Packers selected Clinton-Dix in the first round (21st overall) of the 2014 NFL Draft. Clinton-Dix was the second safety drafted in 2014, behind Louisville safety Calvin Pryor (18th overall).

On May 29, 2014, the Green Bay Packers signed Clinton-Dix to a four-year, $8.33 million contract that includes $7.55 million guaranteed and a signing bonus of $4.38 million. He was issued No. 21 by the Green Bay Packers, which was last worn by Charles Woodson.

Throughout training camp, Clinton-Dix competed against Micah Hyde for the job as the starting free safety. The free safety role was left vacant after the Packers chose not to re-sign M. D. Jennings. Head coach Mike McCarthy named Clinton-Dix the backup free safety, behind Hyde, to begin the regular season.

He made his professional regular season debut in the Green Bay Packers' season-opener at the Seattle Seahawks and recorded five combined tackles, broke up a pass, and made his first career sack in their 26–16 loss. Clinton-Dix made his first career sack on Seahawks' quarterback Russell Wilson in the first quarter. On September 21, 2014, Clinton-Dix made one tackle, a pass deflection, and made his first career interception during a 19–7 loss at the Detroit Lions. He made his first career interception off a pass attempt by Lions' quarterback Matthew Stafford, that was intended for wide receiver Corey Fuller, and returned it for a nine-yard gain in the first quarter. On October 19, 2014, Clinton-Dix earned his first career start at free safety after defensive coordinator Dom Capers elected to start him over Hyde. Clinton-Dix recorded nine combined tackles during a 38–17 victory against the Carolina Panthers in Week 7. Clinton-Dix remained the starting free safety, alongside strong safety Morgan Burnett, for the last ten games and the regular season. In Week 15, he collected a season-high 13 combined tackles (six solo) in the Packers' 21–13 loss at the Buffalo Bills. He finished his rookie season in 2014 with 92 combined tackles (65 solo), six pass deflections, one interception, and one sack in 16 games and ten starts.

The Green Bay Packers finished first in the NFC North with a 12–4 record and earned a first round bye. On January 11, 2015, Clinton-Dix started in his first career playoff game and recorded six combined tackles as the Packers defeated the Dallas Cowboys 26–21 in the NFC Divisional Round. On January 18, 2015, Clinton-Dix made five combined tackles, deflected three passes, and intercepted two passes by Seahawks' quarterback Russell Wilson during the Packers' 28–22 overtime loss to the Seattle Seahawks in the NFC Championship Game.

2015
Clinton-Dix entered training camp slated as the starting free safety and was named the starter to begin the regular season. On November 15, 2015, Clinton-Dix collected a season-high 11 combined tackles (nine solo), broke up a pass, and intercepted a pass by quarterback Matthew Stafford during the Packers' 16–18 loss at the Detroit Lions, which marked their first loss to the Lions at home since 1991. Clinton-Dix started in all 16 games in 2015 and led the team with 100 combined tackles (83 solo) while also recording three pass deflections, three sacks, two interceptions, and one forced fumble.

The Green Bay Packers finished second in the NFC North with a 10–6 record and earned a wildcard berth. On January 16, 2016, Clinton-Dix made four combined tackles, broke up two passes, and intercepted a pass attempt by Cardinals' quarterback Carson Palmer during the Packers' 26–20 overtime loss at the Arizona Cardinals in the NFC Divisional Round.

2016
Head coach Mike McCarthy retained Clinton-Dix and Morgan Burnett as the starting safety tandem for a second consecutive season. On November 6, 2016, Clinton-Dix made three combined tackles, deflected two passes, made two interceptions, and was credited with half a sack during a 31–26 loss to the Indianapolis Colts in Week 9. His two interceptions off of passes by quarterback Andrew Luck marked his first career regular season game with multiple interceptions. In Week 15, he recorded five combined tackles, broke up two passes, and made two interceptions off pass attempts by Bears' quarterback Matt Barkley during a 30–27 win at the Chicago Bears. His performance against the Bears in Week 15 earned him NFC Defensive Player of the Week. On December 20, 2016, it was announced that Clinton-Dix was selected to play in the Pro Bowl. He was also named to the Second-team NFL AP All-Pro team for the first time in his career. Clinton-Dix started in all 16 games in 2016 and recorded 80 combined tackles (62 solo), seven pass deflections, a career-high five interceptions, and was credited with half a sack. He received an overall grade of 83.5 from Pro Football Focus, which was the 13th highest grade among all qualified safeties in 2016. He was ranked 77th by fellow NFL players on the NFL Top 100 Players of 2017.

The Green Bay Packers finished atop of their division with a 10–6 record, clinching a playoff berth. They defeated the New York Giants 38–13 in the NFC Wildcard Game and defeated the Dallas Cowboys 34–31 in the NFC Divisional Round. On January 22, 2017, Clinton-Dix started in the NFC Championship Game and recorded five solo tackles and two pass deflections as the Packers lost 44–21 to the Atlanta Falcons in the NFC Championship Game.

2017
On May 1, 2017, the Green Bay Packers exercised a fifth-year, $5.59 million option. Head coach Mike McCarthy retained Clinton-Dix and Morgan Burnett the starting safety tandem. On September 28, 2017, he collected a season-high eight solo tackles, a pass deflection, and made an interception during a 35–14 victory against the Chicago Bears in Week 4. In Week 13, he collected a season-high nine combined tackles during a 26–20 victory against the Tampa Bay Buccaneers. He started in all 16 games in 2017 and recorded 79 combined tackles (65 solo), six pass deflections, and three interceptions. Clinton-Dix received an overall grade of 79.1 from Pro Football Focus, which ranked as the 40th highest grade among all qualifying safeties in 2017. He was ranked 100th by his peers on the NFL Top 100 Players of 2018.

2018
On January 1, 2018, the Packers announced their decision to fire defensive coordinator Dom Capers. Head coach Mike McCarthy retained Clinton-Dix as the starting free safety to begin the season. On September 30, 2018, Clinton-Dix recorded three solo tackles, broke up a pass, and intercepted a pass by Bills' quarterback Josh Allen during a 22–0 win against the Buffalo Bills in Week 4. It was his third consecutive game with an interception.

Washington Redskins

On October 30, 2018, the Green Bay Packers traded Clinton-Dix to the Washington Redskins in exchange for a fourth round pick in the 2019 NFL Draft. Head coach Jay Gruden immediately named Clinton-Dix the starting free safety. He replaced Montae Nicholson and started alongside strong safety D. J. Swearinger. In Week 11, he collected a season-high 13 combined tackles (11 solo) during a 23–21 loss against the Houston Texans. Clinton-Dix started all 16 games in 2018 and finished the season with 93 combined tackles (80 solo), six pass deflections, three interceptions, two forced fumbles, and one sack. He received an overall grade of 79.3 from Pro Football Focus in 2018, which ranked as the 14th highest grade among all qualifying safeties.

Chicago Bears

On March 14, 2019, Clinton-Dix signed a one-year, $5.5 million deal with the Chicago Bears. In week 3 against his former team, the Washington Redskins, Clinton-Dix recorded a team high 9 tackles, intercepted Case Keenum twice, and returned one of them for a 37-yard touchdown in the 31–15 win. This was his first pick six of his career. In week 4 against the Minnesota Vikings, Clinton-Dix made 4 tackles and recovered a fumble forced by teammate Prince Amukamara on Stefon Diggs in the 16–6 win.
In week 11 against the Los Angeles Rams on Sunday Night Football, Clinton-Dix recovered a fumble forced by teammate Eddie Jackson on running back Todd Gurley in the 17–7 loss.

Dallas Cowboys
On April 7, 2020, the Dallas Cowboys signed Clinton-Dix to a one-year, $3.75 million contract that includes $2.25 million guaranteed and a signing bonus of $1.25 million. He reunited with new Cowboys' head coach Mike McCarthy, who also held the same position with the Green Bay Packers. He was expected to be named one of the starters at safety and replace the recent free agent loss of Jeff Heath, but he was passed on the depth chart by Darian Thompson during training camp. Even though his contract included $2.25 million guaranteed in earnings, he was released one week before the start of the regular season on September 3, 2020.

San Francisco 49ers 
On August 12, 2021, Clinton-Dix signed a one-year contract with the San Francisco 49ers. On August 31, 2021, Clinton-Dix was released by the 49ers.

Las Vegas Raiders
On September 15, 2021, Clinton-Dix was signed to the Las Vegas Raiders practice squad. He was released on December 8, 2021.

Denver Broncos
On December 15, 2021, Clinton-Dix was signed to the Denver Broncos practice squad. His contract expired when the team's season ended on January 8, 2022.

Retirement
On December 29, 2022, Clinton-Dix announced his retirement and signed a one-day contract with the Green Bay Packers.

NFL career statistics

Regular season

Postseason

References

External links

1992 births
Living people
Alabama Crimson Tide football players
All-American college football players
American football safeties
Chicago Bears players
Dallas Cowboys players
Denver Broncos players
Dr. Phillips High School alumni
Green Bay Packers players
National Conference Pro Bowl players
People from Eatonville, Florida
Players of American football from Orlando, Florida
Washington Redskins players
San Francisco 49ers players